Jasmin Sudić (born 24 November 1990) is a Swedish former footballer who played as a centre-back.

Club career
He played for FC Malmö, BK Olympic, and Heleneholms SK as a youth before he joined Malmö FF.

Malmö FF
Sudić made his Allsvenskan debut for Malmö FF in 2008 against Hammarby IF, Malmö FF won the match 6–3. In 2009, he got a breakthrough after fellow defender colleague Jimmy Dixon was sold, Sudić played 18 matches as central defender and played impressively well for such a young player. Sudić missed all but 6 league games in the 2010 season due to a long term knee injury. Sudić managed to recover from the injury but had a backlash when he injured himself again before the 2011 season started. As a result of this he missed the entire season and focused on recover properly for the 2012 season.

Despite his troubles with injuries, Malmö FF wanted to express their trust in Sudić's talent and offered him a new contract until the end of the 2014 season which he accepted, he was also given the number three shirt as part of the new contract. Sudić was back again from his knee injury in time for the 2012 season. He played 9 games in the league and one cup fixture as he found himself in tough competition for the starting spots. This was Sudić's last matches at the club after being sent on loan for the 2013 season and then being sold to Mjällby AIF in the summer of the 2014 season.

Mjällby AIF
It was announced on 14 January 2013 that Sudić would be on loan to fellow Allsvenskan side Mjällby AIF for the duration of the 2013 season. Sudić quickly became an important player for Mjällby during the pre season and took a place in the starting eleven for the start of the season. He played eleven matches for the club before contracting an injury. It was confirmed on 2 July that the injury was a cruciate ligament injury, his third injury of this sort in his career. The injury meant that Sudic would miss the remainder of the season and his loan spell at Mjällby. Sudić returned to the club on a permanent basis on 23 July 2014, signing a two-year contract.

BK Häcken
On 9 January 2015, it was announced that Sudić had signed to play for BK Häcken.

Trelleborgs FF
After a two and a half-year stint at Häcken plagued by injuries, Sudić signed a long term-deal with Trelleborgs FF on 13 July 2018.

International career
Sudić represented Sweden at youth international level, and was considered for the Bosnian senior team.

Career statistics

Honours
BK Häcken
 Svenska Cupen: 2015–16

Footnotes

External links

 
 

1990 births
Living people
Association football defenders
BK Olympic players
Malmö FF players
Mjällby AIF players
BK Häcken players
Trelleborgs FF players
Allsvenskan players
Swedish footballers
Swedish people of Bosnia and Herzegovina descent
Sweden youth international footballers
Sweden under-21 international footballers
Bosnia and Herzegovina emigrants to Sweden